Carolyn J. Krysiak (born August 9, 1939) is an American politician who represented the 46th legislative district in the Maryland House of Delegates. Krysiak was also chairman of the House Facilities Committee, being appointed by Speaker Michael E. Busch to that position in 2005. She did not run for re-election in 2010.

Background

Krysiak was born in Baltimore, Maryland on August 9, 1939. She graduated from The Catholic High School (all girls) and then attended the University of Maryland and the Community College of Baltimore. Prior to taking office she was a supervisor in the Baltimore City Department of Finance. She is of Polish descent.

Legislative notes
 voted for the Clean Indoor Air Act of 2007 (HB359)
 voted for the Healthy Air Act in 2006 (SB154)
 voted for slots in 2005 (HB1361)
 voted for income tax reduction in 1998 (SB750)
 voted in favor of Tax Reform Act of 2007(HB2)

General election results, 2006
2006 Race for Maryland House of Delegates – 46th District
Voters to choose three:
{| class="wikitable"
|-
!Name
!Votes
!Percent
!Outcome
|-
|-
|Peter A. Hammen, Dem.
|15,883
|  29.6%
|   Won
|-
|-
|Carolyn J. Krysiak, Dem.
|15,856
|  29.6%
|   Won
|-
|-
|Brian K. McHale, Dem.
|13,921
|  29.0%
|   Won
|-
|-
|Peter Kimos, Rep.
|6,219
|  11.6%
|   Lost
|-
|Other Write-Ins 
|154
|  0.3%
|   
|-
|}

References

Democratic Party members of the Maryland House of Delegates
Politicians from Baltimore
1939 births
Living people
Women state legislators in Maryland
Baltimore City Community College alumni
American politicians of Polish descent
21st-century American politicians
21st-century American women politicians